Urudayandaluwa Grama Niladhari Division is a Grama Niladhari Division of the Chilaw Divisional Secretariat of Puttalam District of North Western Province, Sri Lanka. It has Grama Niladhari Division Code 569E.

Urudayandaluwa is a surrounded by the Thittakade, Manuwangama East, Manuwangama West, Nariyagama South, Parappanmulla and Thissogama Grama Niladhari Divisions.

Demographics

Ethnicity 
The Urudayandaluwa Grama Niladhari Division has a Sinhalese majority (99.1%). In comparison, the Chilaw Divisional Secretariat (which contains the Urudayandaluwa Grama Niladhari Division) has a Sinhalese majority (82.4%)

Religion 
The Urudayandaluwa Grama Niladhari Division has a Roman Catholic majority (59.1%) and a significant Buddhist population (40.7%). In comparison, the Chilaw Divisional Secretariat (which contains the Urudayandaluwa Grama Niladhari Division) has a Roman Catholic plurality (45.7%) and a significant Buddhist population (36.6%)

References 

Grama Niladhari Divisions of Chilaw Divisional Secretariat